The League of Ireland Cup 2007 was the 34th staging of the League of Ireland Cup.

The 2007 League Cup kicked off in April. Two non-league clubs (Fanad United and Kerry League) joined the 22 league clubs in the draw.  There were sixteen clubs drawn to face each other in the first round, with the other eight given byes to the second round.

First round
Matches played between 1 April and 16 April 2007.

Second round
Matches played on 5 May and 8 May 2007.

Quarter-finals
Matches played on 2 July and 3 July 2007.

Semi-finals
Matches played on 7 August and 28 August 2007.

Final

External links
Ireland League Cup on rsssf website

2007
3
Cup